Harold Reay (1896 – 14 May 1959) was an English professional footballer who played as a winger.

References

1896 births
1959 deaths
Footballers from Sunderland
English footballers
Association football wingers
Margate F.C. players
Sunderland A.F.C. players
Preston North End F.C. players
Grimsby Town F.C. players
English Football League players